Eduard Vanaaseme (25 July 1898 – 2 March 1991) was an Estonian lightweight weightlifter. In 1922 he won a national title and a silver medal at the world championships, and set an unofficial world record in press. He placed sixth at the 1924 Summer Olympics. After retiring from competitions he worked as a bookbinder and acted as a weightlifting referee.

References

1898 births
1991 deaths
Sportspeople from Tartu
People associated with physical culture
People from the Governorate of Livonia
Olympic weightlifters of Estonia
Weightlifters at the 1924 Summer Olympics
Estonian male weightlifters
World Weightlifting Championships medalists